Celestino Lester Vega was a cigar maker, President of Centro Español and a promoter of Spanish arts and culture. He is listed as a Great Floridian. Vega was born in Asturias, Spain November 27, 1897. He emigrated to Tampa. He faced labor protests and demands from strikers. Mrs. Celestino Vega (Carolina Sanchez Vega?) was on the board of the Tampa League of Women's Clubs.

Lester Celestino Vega was born 27 November 1897 Llamero, Asturias, Spain - he married Mamie Stella Powell.

Celestino Camilo Vega was born 6 April 1870 in Gijon, Asturias, Spain, and he married Carolina Sanchez.

We feel very confident that these two men were indeed related, but some of the data you have indicated here is in fact for Lester Celestino Vega rather than for Celestino Camilo Vega. Both were cigar makers - both were born in Asturias, Spain - both immigrated to Tampa from Havana, Cuba.

References

Cigar makers